Statice limonium may refer to:
Statice limonium Bigelow
Statice limonium Cav. ex Willk. & Lange
Statice limonium L., accepted as Limonium vulgare Mill.
Statice limonium Pall.
Statice limonium Thunb.
Statice limonium var. californica (Boiss. ex DC.) A.Gray, accepted as Limonium californicum (Boiss.) A.Heller
Statice limonium var. caroliniana (Walter) A.Gray, accepted as Limonium carolinianum (Walter) Britton

References